Ischnocnema is a genus of frogs from eastern Brazil and north-eastern Argentina. They comprise the former Eleutherodactylus from this region, but they are closer to Brachycephalus than the "true" Eleutherodactylus. Consequently, they are now placed in their own genus Ischnocnema in the family Brachycephalidae.

Species
The following species: are recognised in the genus Ischnocnema:

References

 
Brachycephalidae
Amphibian genera
Amphibians of South America
Taxa named by Christian Frederik Lütken
Taxa named by Johannes Theodor Reinhardt